Pirates of the Caribbean: The Curse of the Black Pearl is a 2003 video game prequel to the film of the same name, developed by British company Pocket Studios.

Story line
Just like the film, Jack Sparrow fails to listen to Barbossa and walks the plank. He ends up in a jungle, later finding himself in Port Royal, fighting British soldiers and pirates along the way.

Gameplay
The player plays as Captain Jack Sparrow and cannot save their progress, instead the player must keep track of passwords that show up at the end of each level. The game is divided by separate missions. The two main aspects of the game is the land based adventure play and maneuvering a ship and having battles with other ships. The game does not follow the plot of the film of the same name but some characters and locations (like Port Royal) appear in the game.

Reception

The game received "generally unfavorable reviews" according to video game review aggregator Metacritic. GameSpot concluded in their review, "Simply put, the bare minimum has been put into Pirates of the Caribbean." IGN noted "the battle between pirate vs. pirate in Pirates of the Caribbean is a basic and tedious button-masher".

References

External links

2003 video games
Action video games
Pirates of the Caribbean video games
Game Boy Advance games
Game Boy Advance-only games
Video games developed in the United Kingdom
Video games scored by Allister Brimble
Video games set in the Caribbean
Video games set in Haiti
Video games set in Jamaica
TDK Mediactive games
Single-player video games
Pocket Studios games